The Washington Open is the Washington state open golf tournament, open to both amateur and professional golfers. It is organized by the Pacific Northwest section of the PGA of America. It has been played annually since 1922 at a variety of courses around the state.

Winners

2022 Colin Inglis
2021 Jeff Coston
2020 Colin Inglis
2019 Shane Prante
2018 Ryan Benzel
2017 Drew McCullough (a)
2016 Jeff Coston
2015 Darren Black
2014 John Cassidy
2013 Chris Griffin
2012 Jeff Gove
2011 Tim Feenstra
2010 Jeff Coston
2009 Brian Thornton
2008 Brian Nosler
2007 Tim Feenstra
2006 Josh Immordino (a)
2005 Michael Combs
2004 Keith Coleman
2003 Todd Erwin
2002 Bill Porter
2001 Jeff Coston
2000 Todd Erwin
1999 Jeff Coston
1998 Keith Liedes
1997 Keith Coleman (a)
1996 Jeff Coston
1995 Jeff Gove
1994 Rick Acton
1993 Todd Erwin
1992 Todd Erwin
1991 Jim Strickland
1990 Jim Strickland
1989 Brian Mogg
1988 Rod Marcum
1987 Don Bies
1986 Jeff Bloom (a)
1985 Mike Gove
1984 Chris Mitchell
1983 Mike Davis
1982 Steve Stull
1981 Rick Acton
1980 Don Bies
1979 Rick Acton
1978 Fred Couples (a)
1977 Dave Barr
1976 Chuck Milne
1975 Fred Haney
1974 Bill Wakeham
1973 Chuck Milne
1972 Mike Davis
1971 Al Mengert
1970 Bob Duden
1969 Bob Duden
1968 Joe Colello (a)
1967 Al Feldman
1966 Ken Still
1965 Al Mengert
1964 Al Mengert
1963 Al Mengert
1962 Charles Congdon
1961 Jerry Fehr (a)
1960 Bob Duden
1959 Don Bies
1958 Tom Everham
1957 Don Taylor (a)
1956 Eddie Draper (a)
1955 Bud Ward
1954 Tom Boucher
1953 Harold West
1952 Charles Congdon
1951 Emery Zimmerman
1950 Charles Congdon
1949 Bud Ward (a)
1948 Al Zimmerman
1947 Charles Congdon
1942-46 no tournament
1941 Emery Zimmerman
1940 Emery Zimmerman
1939 Charles Congdon
1938 Bud Ward (a)
1937 Ted Longworth
1936 Harry Givan (a)
1935 Al Zimmerman
1934 Emery Zimmerman
1933 Ted Longworth
1932 Neil Christian
1931 Frank Rodia
1930 Bert Wilde
1929 Frank Rodia
1928 Walter Pursey
1927 Neil Christian
1926 Walter Pursey
1925 Neil Christian
1924 Davie Black
1923 Al Espinosa
1922 Al Espinosa

(a) – amateur

External links
PGA of America – Pacific Northwest section
List of winners

Golf in Washington (state)
PGA of America sectional tournaments
State Open golf tournaments
1922 establishments in Washington (state)